Grandpaw Would is the first solo studio album by Australian indie pop artist Ben Lee, released in 1995 as his band Noise Addict disbanded.

Track listing
 "Pop Queen" – 3:28
 "How Can That Be?" – 1:58
 "Sprawl" – 1:28
 "I'm with the Star" – 3:44
 "Don't Leave" – 1:58
 "Away with the Pixies" – 3:02
 "Bolt" – 1:03
 "Side View" – 2:39
 "Pathetic" – 1:08
 "Song 4 You" – 2:37
 "Trying to Sneeze" – 2:26
 "The Loft" – 2:27
 "Frigid" – 2:29
 "Stumbling Block" – 2:56
 "Ductile" – 1:25
 "Love Song" – 0:52
 "Green Hearts" – 2:41
 "My Guitar" – 3:27
 "Get Your Sleep" *
 "The Waiting Game" *
 "Be a Kid" *
[* Japanese bonus tracks]

Singles
"Pop Queen" (1994)
"Away with the Pixies" (1995)

References

1995 debut albums
Ben Lee albums
Grand Royal albums
Albums produced by Brad Wood